Edenmore is a locality and townland within Raheny on the Northside of Dublin, Ireland, with several housing developments and a mid-size municipal park. It lies within the Dublin 5 postal district.

History
Edenmore was developed by Dublin Corporation in the early 1960s on two of Raheny's townlands, then largely empty.  While it is part of Raheny and shown in addresses as Edenmore, Raheny, it has, with its own schools, small shopping centre, Roman Catholic church, health centre, youth centre, football and boxing clubs, a quite distinct identity.

Location and access
Edenmore is bordered by the Ayrfield part of Coolock across the Tonlegee Road to the north, Coolock proper to the north west, Harmonstown west, the core of Raheny to the south and south east, and Donaghmede and Kilbarrack to the north east and east.

Edenmore is serviced by the Dublin Bus routes, 27, 27A and 104. Raheny and Harmonstown DART stations are also both short walking distances away.

Amenities
Edenmore Park, a mid-size municipal park, offers a range of sporting facilities, including a pitch and putt course.

Religion
Edenmore is also a parish in the Howth deanery of the Roman Catholic Archdiocese of Dublin, served by St. Monica's Church.

Community services 
The Edenmore Community Development Project is based within Edenmore and adopts Community Development Principles as a means of working towards overall improvements for the area.

Other community services operating within the area include:
 St Monica's Community Council
 St Monica's Information Shop
 Edenmore Drugs Intervention Team
 Edenmore Drugs Outreach Team 
 St Monica's Youth Centre
 Edenpark Health Centre

Scouting
Edenmore has a large scout unit, the 74th Edenmore, consisting of beavers, cubs and scouts and founded by Chief Scout Colin Roden in 1984. The unit moved into a new den in January 2010, behind the Concord public house.

References

External links 
 The Edenmore Community Development Project
 Dublin North East Drugs Task Force (Edenmore Project)
 St Monicas Youth Centre
 Edenpark Surgey

Raheny